Corinne Hannah Watts is a New Zealand entomologist and ecologist. Specimens collected by Watts are held at Museum of New Zealand Te Papa Tongarewa.

Education 
Watts graduated from Victoria University of Wellington with a MSc (Hons) in Ecology in 1999, and gained a PhD in Invertebrate Ecology from the University of Canterbury in 2006.

Conservation and entomology work 
Watts is employed by Landcare Research in Hamilton, New Zealand, in the Biodiversity and Conservation team. Watts has been involved in the conservation of wētā, including the Mahoenui giant wētā, a large and endangered species native to New Zealand. Watts has also been involved with Landcare's tūī conservation work.  Watts has also researched the impacts of predator-fences at Maungatautari, Waikato. In 2006, Watts was part of a team who first described Houdinia flexilissima, a species of moth endemic to New Zealand.

Selected works 
 Innes, J.; Watts, C.; Fitzgerald, N.; Thornburrow, D.; Burns, B.; Mackay, J.; Speedy, C. (8-12 February 2010). Unexpected behaviour of invader ship rats experimentally released behind a pest-proof fence. Island invasives: eradication and management. Auckland. pp. 38.
Innes, J.G.; Watts, C.H.; Burns, B.R. (5-9 December 2011). Research in community-led sanctuaries in New Zealand. 25th International Congress for Conservation Biology (ICCB): "Engaging Society in Conservation". Auckland. pp. 129.
Innes, J.; Watts, C.; Fitzgerald, N.; Thornburrow, D.; Burns, B.; MacKay, J.; Speedy, C. (2011). "Behaviour of invader ship rats experimentally released behind a pest-proof fence, Maungatautari, New Zealand." Occasional papers of the IUCN Species Survival Commission. 42: 437–440.
Watts, C.; Thornburrow, D. (2011). "Habitat use, behavior and movement patterns of a threatened New Zealand giant weta, Deinacrida heteracantha (Anostostomatidae: Orthoptera)." Journal of Orthoptera Research. 20 (1): 127–135.
Watts, C.; Stringer, I.; Gibbs, G. (2012). "Insect conservation in New Zealand: an historical perspective." In Insect Conservation: Past, Present and Prospect. Springer Science + Business Media. pp. 213–243. 
Watts, C.; Empson, R.; Thornburrow, D.; Rohan, M. (2012). "Movements, behaviour and survival of adult Cook Strait giant weta (Deinacrida rugosa; Anostostomatidae: Orthoptera) immediately after translocation as revealed by radiotracking." Journal of Insect Conservation. 16 (5): 763–776. doi:10.1007/s10841-012-9461-8.
Watts, C.; Thornburrow, D.; Innes, J. (2012). "Monitoring invertebrates in community-led sanctuaries."  Kararehe Kino - Vertebrate Pest Research. 20: 16–17.
Watts, Corinne; Thornburrow, Danny; Stringer, Ian; Cave, Vanessa. (2017). "Population expansion by Cook Strait giant wētā, Deinacrida rugosa (Orthoptera: Anostostomatidae), following translocation to Matiu/Somes Island, New Zealand, and subsequent changes in abundance." Journal of Orthoptera Research. 26 (2): 171–180. doi: 10.3897/jor.26.21712.

References 

Living people
New Zealand entomologists
New Zealand women scientists
Victoria University of Wellington alumni
University of Canterbury alumni
21st-century women scientists
Year of birth missing (living people)
Women entomologists